Foreign relations of Latvia are the primary responsibility of the Ministry of Foreign Affairs. Today's Republic of Latvia regards itself as a continuation of the 1918–1940 republic. After the declaration on the restoration of its full independence on August 21, 1991, Latvia became a member of the United Nations on September 17, 1991, and is a signatory to a number of UN organizations and other international agreements. Latvia welcomes further cooperation and integration with NATO, European Union, OECD and other Western organizations. It also seeks more active participation in UN peacekeeping efforts worldwide.

Council of Europe, CERCO, International Council for the Exploration of the Sea, International Civil Aviation Organization, International Atomic Energy Agency, UNESCO, UNICEF, International Criminal Court, the World Bank, International Monetary Fund, and the European Bank for Reconstruction and Development. It also is a member of the Organization for Security and Co-operation in Europe (OSCE) and of the North Atlantic Coordinating Council.

On September 20, 2003, in a nationwide referendum, the Latvians voted to join the European Union and Latvia's EU membership took effect on May 1, 2004. Latvia became a member state of NATO on March 29, 2004.

Diplomatic relations 

Latvia maintains diplomatic relations with all UN members except Bhutan.

Relations by country

See also
 Honorary Consulate of the Republic of Latvia in Lviv
 List of diplomatic missions in Latvia
 Ministry of Foreign Affairs (Latvia)

References

 
Government of Latvia